John D. Gartner is an American psychologist, psychotherapist, author, and former assistant professor at Johns Hopkins University Medical School.

Education
Gartner graduated magna cum laude from Princeton University, received a PhD in clinical psychology from the University of Massachusetts Amherst, then completed his post-doctoral training at Weill Medical College of Cornell University.

Career
Gartner is a psychotherapist with private practices in Baltimore and Manhattan, where he specialized in the treatment of borderline personality disorder, bipolar disorder and depression. He was a part-time professor, until 2015, for 28 years at Johns Hopkins University Medical School, and is a widely published author of books, and of articles for scientific and other journals.

Political activism

2017 mental fitness for Office of President Trump petition

In the first months of 2017 Gartner collected the signatures of more than 25,000 mental health professionals and laypersons. The petition, "Mental Health Professionals Declare Trump is Mentally Ill And Must Be Removed", was sent to the Minority leader, Senator Chuck Schumer of New York. At the end of April 2017, Gartner sent the petition to Washington D.C. with more than 41,000 signatures, although he failed to disclose that it was not only of mental health professionals.

The petition's declaration stated that:
We, the undersigned mental health professionals (please state your degree), believe in our professional judgment that Donald Trump manifests a serious mental illness that renders him psychologically incapable of competently discharging the duties of President of the United States. And we respectfully request he be removed from office, according to article 4 of the 25th amendment to the Constitution, which states that the president will be replaced if he is “unable to discharge the powers and duties of his office".

According to Gartner, Trump's mental handicaps are a mixture of narcissism, paranoia, sociopathy and a measure of sadism.

Duty to Warn 
In 2017, Gartner founded Duty To Warn, an organization of mental health professionals and laypersons who consider it their duty to warn patients, clients and the community-at-large, when aware of potential danger.

Bibliography
Gartner is the author of numerous scholarly articles and several books, including:
The Hypomanic Edge (2005), in which he argues that many American leaders could be diagnosed as "hypomanic"
In Search of Bill Clinton (2008) which claimed Bill Clinton showed manic tendencies
Rocket Man: Nuclear Madness and the Mind of Donald Trump

References

External links
 The Psychology of Donald Trump
 We May Need the Twenty-fifth Amendment if Trump Loses
 Trump’s dangerous narcissism may have changed leadership forever

Year of birth missing (living people)
Living people
21st-century American psychologists
Political psychology
Criticism of Donald Trump
Princeton University alumni
University of Massachusetts Amherst alumni
Weill Cornell Medical College alumni